The Aterno-Pescara (ancient Aternus from the Greek Aternos, Άτερνος) is a river system in Abruzzo, eastern central Italy. The river is known as the Aterno near its source in the mountains, but takes the name Pescara, actually a tributary, nearer the city of Pescara and the Adriatic Sea.

The river flows in a southeastern direction past Pizzoli, L'Aquila, Paganica, San Demetrio ne' Vestini, and Castelvecchio Subequo through the Appennino Abruzzese mountains. It subsequently flows until the Valle Peligna (or Sulmona plateau) near Raiano, where it curves northward and receives its main tributary, the Sagittario. Later, near Popoli, it crosses the border into the province of Pescara and joins with the short, but large volumed, Pescara, by which name it is thenceforth usually known. The river flows in a northeast direction past Tocco da Casauria and Torre de' Passeri before forming the border between the province of Pescara and the province of Chieti for a short distance. It flows into the Adriatic Sea at the city of Pescara.

References

Adriatic Italian coast basins
Rivers of the Province of L'Aquila
Rivers of the Province of Chieti
Rivers of the Province of Pescara
Rivers of Italy